Night on Earth is the third and last release by the black metal band Dawn of Relic. It was released in 2005 on Season of Mist records and was re-issued in 2006 and 2008.

Track listing

Line-up
 Jukka Juntunen - drums
 Rauli Roininen - guitars
 Teemu Luukinen - guitars

Session
 Kai Jaakkola - vocals
 Sampo Heikkinen - synthesizers
 Jarno Juntunen - vocals (backing)
 IIkka Lassila - vocals (backing)
 Toni Laine - bass guitar

References

External links
Metalreview.com review

Dawn of Relic albums
2005 albums
Season of Mist albums